Jinawang  is a village development committee in Rolpa District in the Rapti Zone of north-eastern Nepal. At the time of the 2011 Nepal census it had a population of 5156 people living in 979 individual households.there peoples are worked in agricultural such as kiwi,apple,potato.

References

Populated places in Rolpa District